Sessera Valley (in Italian Valle Sessera) is a valley in north-east of Piedmont in the Province of Biella, Italy.

Etymology
The valley takes its name from the river Sessera, a right-hand tributary of the Sesia which flows through the valley.

Geography
The municipalities of the lowest part of the valley are Ailoche, Caprile, Coggiola, Crevacuore, Guardabosone, Pray and Portula. Its highest part is used as pasture and administratively is divided in several exclaves belonging to the municipalities of the central part of the Province of Biella.

Notable summits
Among the notable summits which surround the valley (al belonging to the Biellese Alps) there are:

 Monte Bo - 2.556 m
 Testone delle Tre Alpi - 2.081 m
 Cima dell'Asnas - 2.039 m
 Monte Barone - 2.044 m
 Cima delle Guardie - 2.001 m

Nature conservation 
The highest part of the valley and some surrounding areas are included in a SIC (Site of Community Importance) of 10,786.73 ha called Val Sessera (code  IT1130002).

See also
 Biellese Alps
 Bocchetto Sessera

Notes and references

External links

 http://www.cmsesseramossoprealpi.it/on-line/Home.html 

Valleys of Piedmont
Valleys of the Alps
Province of Biella
Biellese Alps